Crown Hill may refer to:

Canada
 Crown Hill, Ontario

New Zealand
 Crown Hill, New Zealand, in Auckland

United States
 Crown Hill Park in Jefferson County, Colorado
 Crown Hill, South Dakota, a ghost town
 Crown Hill, Seattle, Washington
 Crown Hill, West Virginia

See also 
 Crown Hill Cemetery (disambiguation)